Gianluca De Ponti (born July 14, 1952 in Firenze, Italy) was a professional footballer who during his career played for Impruneta, Terranuovese, Sangiovannese, Cesena, Bologna, Avellino, Sampdoria, Ascoli and Żurrieq, throughout his career he played as a striker.

Playing career
In 1974, Gianluca joined Serie C team Sangiovannese, a team for which he scored 14 goals in 32 appearances. On the October 12, 1975, Gianluca De Ponti made his debut in Serie A, wearing the Cesena "Fiorita" shirt against Roma.

De Ponti was well known for his extravagant character (walking around in a fur coat and a duck on a leash), a little inclined to compromise, he was loved by everyone in his long career as a footballer.

References

External links
Gianluca De Ponti interview 

Living people
1952 births
Italian footballers
Bologna F.C. 1909 players
Żurrieq F.C. players
A.S.D. Sangiovannese 1927 players

Association football forwards